Bahria Foundation is a Pakistani conglomerate company based in Karachi, Pakistan. The business is run by the Pakistan Navy and was established for welfare of its employees in 1982.

It is currently headed by Vice Admiral (R) Shah Sohail Masood.

Subsidiaries

It owns following assets:

 Bahria Foundation Schools and Colleges
 Bahria Maritime Works Organization

See also
 Shaheen Foundation
 Fauji Foundation

References

External links

Pakistan Navy
Conglomerate companies of Pakistan
Companies based in Karachi
1982 establishments in Pakistan
Conglomerate companies established in 1982